Nikola Ćaćić and Antonio Šančić were the defending champions but chose not to defend their title.

Andre Begemann and Albano Olivetti won the title after defeating Ivan and Matej Sabanov 6–3, 6–2 in the final.

Seeds

Draw

References

 Main draw

Sparkassen ATP Challenger - Doubles
2020 Doubles